Jules Louis Eskin (October 20, 1931 – November 15, 2016) was an American cellist who was the principal cellist of the Boston Symphony Orchestra. He was born in Philadelphia. With conductor Seiji Ozawa, he is known for solo performances of well-known works by Johannes Brahms, Gabriel Fauré, and Beethoven. Prior to joining the Boston Symphony Orchestra, he spent three years with the Cleveland Orchestra under George Szell. He also played for the Boston Chamber Players and Burton Quintet Five.

Eskin died at the age of 85 on November 15, 2016 in Brookline, Massachusetts from cancer.

References

1931 births
2016 deaths
Deaths from cancer in Massachusetts
Musicians from Philadelphia
American cellists